Fort Golgotha and the Old Burial Hill Cemetery is the site of an historic cemetery, officially known as the "Old Burying Ground", and the location of a former Revolutionary War-era fort, known as Fort Golgotha, at Main Street (NY 25A) and Nassau Road in Huntington, New York. It is located in the Old Town Green Historic District and Old Town Hall Historic District.

The fort, which takes its name from Golgotha, was built by British troops in 1782 on orders of Colonel Thompson, commander of the King's American Dragoons, on the site of the town burial ground. The nearby Presbyterian Church was dismantled, and its timbers used in the fort's construction. The fort was one, of a network, of British fortifications, in and around Huntington.  East of town there was a larger fortification, on the site later, known as Gallows Hill, now known as "Fort Hill", Fort Slongo (now known as Fort Salonga) even further to the east, and Fort Franklin to the north on Lloyd Neck. After the British troops withdrew in 1783, the fort was dismantled, the burial grounds restored and the Presbyterian Church rebuilt. The site was added to the National Register of Historic Places in 1981.

References

External links

 
 The 1892 Soldiers & Sailors Memorial Building (Huntington Historical Society)

Cemeteries on the National Register of Historic Places in New York (state)
Government buildings completed in 1782
Infrastructure completed in 1782
Cemeteries in Suffolk County, New York
National Register of Historic Places in Huntington (town), New York
Golgotha
Golgotha
Golgotha
1782 establishments in New York (state)